Nemesis Records was an American independent record label which released the Offspring's debut studio album, The Offspring, in 1989 as well as their 1991 EP Baghdad. Nemesis was founded by Frank Harrison, distributed by Cargo Records from Canada and closed in 1993.

Artists
A Chorus of Disapproval
Against The Wall	
Bloodline
Bonesaw
Billingsgate
Brujeria
B'zrker	
Chicano-Christ
The Chorus
Crankshaft 
Curious George
Downside
Face Value
Final Conflict
Fishwife
Gameface
Haywire
Hunger Farm
Insted
Intent To Injure	
Left Insane	
The Offspring
Olivelawn
Once And For All	
One Step Ahead
Our Band Sucks	
Pitchfork
Point Blank
Reason To Believe
Schleprock	
Smile
Toetag
Uniform Choice	
Vision
Visual Discrimination
Walk Proud

References

American independent record labels
Defunct record labels of the United States
Punk record labels
Hardcore record labels
Record labels established in 1988
Record labels disestablished in 1993
1988 establishments in California